Aq Masjed may refer to:
 Aq Masjed, Ardabil
 Aq Masjed, Astara, Gilan Province
 Aq Masjed, Rezvanshahr, Gilan Province